The 2019 Asia-Pacific Rally Championship was an international rally championship sanctioned by the FIA. It was the 32nd championship and underwent a major format change. For the first time the two Cups, the Asian Cup and the Pacific Cup, acted as qualifying events for a "Grand Final" at the China Rally Longyou where the highest qualified winner becomes the Asia-Pacific champion.

The championship was contested by a combination of regulations with Group R competing directly against Super 2000 cars.

The Pacific Cup began in New Zealand on 12 April and finished in Australia on 25 August after four rallies. The Asia Cup began in Japan on 6 June and finished on 27 October in China.

New Zealanders won both Cups, Hyundai driver Hayden Paddon won the Pacific Cup while Toyota driver Mike Young won the Asia Cup. Young raced for the Asia-Pacific title and Paddon did not. A mechanical problem delayed Young on the first day of the deciding rally. Taiwanese Subaru driver Dewei Lin won the rally and the championship ahead of another New Zealander, Mazda driver Andrew Hawkeswood and Japanese Citroën driver, Suguru Kawana.

Event calendar and results

Pacific Cup
The 2019 APRC Pacific Cup was as follows:

Asia Cup
The 2019 APRC Asia Cup was as follows:

Championship standings

Pacific Cup
The 2019 APRC Pacific Cup for Drivers points was as follows:

Asia Cup
The 2019 APRC Asia Cup for Drivers points was as follows:

References

External links

APRC Live Podcast
APRC News and Video

Asia-Pacific Rally Championship seasons
Asia-Pacific
Asia-Pacific
Asia-Pacific